Ramón Patricio Ávila Castro (born February 20, 1982) is a Chilean former footballer who played as a forward for clubs in Chile and El Salvador.

Club career
Born in Villa Alegre, Chile, Ávila played in the Colo Colo youth teams before joining Rangers de Talca in 2001.

He spent the most part of his career with Rangers, with a stint in El Salvador, where he played for Luis Ángel Firpo and won the league title in 2008. He retired in 2010 while he played for Rangers in the Primera B de Chile.

Personal life
In December 2021, he had a heart attack when he was a player of the amateur club 8 1/2 from Talca.

Honours
Luis Ángel Firpo
 Salvadoran Primera División: 2008 Clausura

References

External links

Ramón Ávila at PlaymakerStats.com

1982 births
Living people
People from Linares Province
Association football forwards
Chilean footballers
Chilean expatriate footballers
Rangers de Talca footballers
C.D. Luis Ángel Firpo footballers
Chilean Primera División players
Primera B de Chile players
Salvadoran Primera División players
Chilean expatriate sportspeople in El Salvador
Expatriate footballers in El Salvador